Sterling Hayden was an American actor.

Films

Television

External links

Hayden, Sterling
Hayden, Sterling